Claudius Billiet better known under the pseudonym Antony Rénal (26 April 1805 in Lyon – 2 October 1866 in Fontaines-sur-Saône) was a French writer, poet, songwriter and playwright.

Life 
He became a literary critic at the Moniteur judiciaire where he published under his real name Dictionnaire des pseudonymes, 1869, </ref>

Works 
 Stances sur la mort du général Foy, Brunet, 1825
 Chansons et romances, Brissot-Thivars, 1829
 Nouveaux Mélanges, discours, anecdotes, poésies, Bouland, 1829
 Nouvelles esquisses poétiques, 1832
 Emany, novel, épisode de la Restauration, H. Souverain, 1837
 La Robe rouge, 2 vol, H. Souverain, 1839
 Le Giaour, Grand Opera in 3 acts, with Louis Tavernier, music by Jules Bovéry, 1839
 Lectures en famille, ou les Soirées d'hiver, récits amusants, P.-C. Lehuby, 1843
 Le Soir à la Veillée, with Marius-Pierre Audran, 1843
 Les Veillées des jeunes enfants, Cosnier and Lachèse, 1844
 Le Berquin du hameau, ou le Conteur des bords du Rhône, scènes historiques, esquisses biographiques et récits tirés de notre histoire ancienne et moderne, 1846
 Les illustrations littéraires de l'Espagne, biographie outlines, 1849
 Jacques Juiltard, pièce de vers, 1850
 Les Encouragements du premier âge, ou Historiettes instructives et amusantes, P.-C. Lehuby, 1851
 Les Pompiers de Fontaines, Rey-Sézanne, 1851
 Coup d’œil sur le mouvement littéraire et artistique au midi de la France, premières années du XIXe siècle, H. Souverain, 1853
 Les Enfants de Fontaine, ou la Saint-Louis, Perrin, 1853
 Joies et plaintes, poésies nouvelles, Arnault de Vresse, 1856
 Critiques littéraires, nouvelles et feuilletons au gré de la plume, Duperret, 1859

Bibliography 
 Joseph-Marie Quérard, Les Écrivains pseudonymes et autres mystificateurs de la littérature, 1854, 
 Aimé Vingtrinier, Note sur deux pamphlets anonymes parus à Lyon sous la Restauration, 1903, 
 Robert Sabatier, Histoire de la poésie française - Poésie du XIXe siècle, 1977,

References

External links 

1805 births
1866 deaths
Writers from Lyon
19th-century French poets
French chansonniers
French literary critics
19th-century French dramatists and playwrights
19th-century French male writers
French male non-fiction writers